3170 may refer to:

In general
 A.D. 3170, a year in the 4th millennium CE
 3170 BC, a year in the 4th millennium BCE
 3170, a number in the 3000 (number) range

Places
 3170 Dzhanibekov, an asteroid in the Asteroid Belt, the 3170th asteroid registered
 Hawaii Route 3170, a state highway
 Louisiana Highway 3170, a state highway
 Texas Farm to Market Road 3170, a state highway

Other uses
 Model 3170 DOT stool
 3170th Special Weapons Group, of the U.S. Air Force

See also

 Lima-Hamilton A-3170, a diesel locomotive